Oscar Eriksson (28 June 1889 – 25 December 1958) was a Swedish sport shooter who competed in the 1920 Summer Olympics. In 1920 he won the silver medal as member of the Swedish team in the team small-bore rifle competition. He also participated in the individual small-bore rifle event but his exact place is unknown.

References

External links
profile

1889 births
1958 deaths
Swedish male sport shooters
ISSF rifle shooters
Olympic shooters of Sweden
Shooters at the 1920 Summer Olympics
Olympic silver medalists for Sweden
Medalists at the 1920 Summer Olympics
Sportspeople from Örebro
19th-century Swedish people
20th-century Swedish people